The Reserve Bank of Zimbabwe is the central bank of Zimbabwe and is headquartered in the capital city Harare.

History

The bank traces its history to the Reserve Bank of Rhodesia, founded on 22 May 1964, but which succeeded the Bank of Rhodesia and Nyasaland (1956-1963) which had been liquidated at the collapse of the Federation of Rhodesia and Nyasaland in 1963. Prior to 1956, there was a Central African Currency Board from 1953, but which had been established as the Southern Rhodesia Currency Board in 1938 to provide Rhodesian currency, fully backed and bound to the British pound sterling at par face value. The local currency which Central African Currency Board was mandated to supply to Southern Rhodesia (colonial Zimbabwe), Northern Rhodesia (colonial Zambia) and Nyasaland (colonial Malawi) had been established through the Southern Rhodesia Coinage and Currency Act of 1932. The Reserve Bank of Rhodesia (which became the Reserve Bank of Zimbabwe at independence in 1980) has continued to function, and has grown in operations and staff, through a variety of changes in sovereignty and governmental structure in Rhodesia and Zimbabwe.

Building location 
For over 4 decades the RBZ operated from the Reserve Bank Building along Samora Machel Avenue (formerly Jameson Avenue) adjacent to First Street. In the late 1980s a competition was conducted to design the new building and the winning design was by Clinton & Evans and Architects, the engineer was Marjem Chatterton; they went on to design the Reserve Bank of Malawi Building as well. Construction of the new RBZ building began in 1993 and was fully completed in 1997 but was officially opened by President Robert Mugabe on May 31, 1996. The building is the tallest in Zimbabwe standing at a height of 394 feet (120 m) with 28 floors above ground.

Structure and governors 

The Reserve Bank of Zimbabwe Act provides for a board of directors and a governor. The governor, assisted by three deputy governors, is responsible for the day-to-day administration and operations of the bank. The current governor is John Panonetsa Mangudya. The governor and his three deputies are appointed by the president for five-year terms that may be renewed. The governor also serves as chairman of the board. The board's membership includes the three deputies and a maximum of seven other non-executive directors, intended to represent key sectors of the economy.

Governors of the Reserve Bank of Rhodesia 
Anthony Grafftey-Smith, 1956-1960
B. C. J. Richards, 1960-1964
Noel H. Bruce, 1964-1976
Desmond Krogh, 1976-1980

Governors of the Reserve Bank of Zimbabwe

The Governor is appointed by the President of Zimbabwe for renewable five-year-terms. 

 Desmond Krogh, 1980 - 1983, transitional governor from Reserve Bank of Rhodesia
 Kombo James Moyana, 1983 - 1993, deputy in 1981
 Leonard Tsumba, 1993 - June 2003
 Charles Chikaura, June 2003 - December 2003, acting
 Gideon Gono, 2003-2013
 Charity Dhliwayo, 2013-2014, acting
 John Mangudya, 2014-

Operations 

The Reserve Bank's most important role is to create and enact monetary policies. According to the bank's website, as the only producer of Zimbabwe's bank notes and coins, it regulates the amount of money in circulation. However, since a range of foreign currencies is currently in use for domestic transactions, the bank's ability to control money supply is limited. The Reserve Bank also looks after the country's gold, as well as purchase and refine precious minerals like diamonds, gold and silver through its subsidiary Fidelity Printers and Refinery. The bank serves as an advisor to the government, providing the government with daily banking services. It is also active in promoting financial inclusion policy and is a member of the Alliance for Financial Inclusion.

Relevancy

Due to the unstable economic conditions and failure to control inflation (2008), economists have suggested that the Reserve Bank be abolished. Some economists have suggested that the Reserve Bank of Zimbabwe be reformed. Legislation in 2008 was debated in the lower house of the Zimbabwean parliament with a view to limiting the so-called quasi-fiscal activities of the Reserve Bank.

See also

 Banknotes of the Reserve Bank of Zimbabwe
 Economy of Zimbabwe
 Zimbabwe Mint
 Payment system
 Zimbabwean Bond Coins
 Real-time gross settlement
 Zimbabwean Bond Notes
 RTGS Dollar
 List of central banks of Africa
 List of central banks

References

External links
 Official site: Reserve Bank of Zimbabwe

Zimbabwe
Economy of Zimbabwe
Banks established in 1956
1956 establishments in the Federation of Rhodesia and Nyasaland